The Chair of the People's Party for Freedom and Democracy is the party chair, chief administrator and manager of the People's Party for Freedom and Democracy (VVD) in the Netherlands. The current chair is Christianne van der Wal, in office since 25 November 2017. Vice Chairman Eric Wetzels is in office since 20 May 2017.

History
The VVD Chair is the head of the party board and leads several committees. The duties of the Chair are typically concerned with the party membership as a whole, and the activities of the party organization, the internal party governance, its finances and the Telders Foundation think tank.

The Chair plays an important role in strategies to recruit and retain members, in campaign fundraising.

Due to a separation of power in the People's Party for Freedom and Democracy's structure the Chair is relatively weak and merely controls the party organization.

The Leader of the People's Party for Freedom and Democracy is the most senior politician within the People's Party for Freedom and Democracy and decides over the party's political course.

Chairs

Vice Chairs
 Pieter Oud (28 January 1948 – 8 April 1949)
 Harm van Riel (8 April 1949 – 15 May 1963)
 Johan Witteveen (15 May 1963 – 24 July 1963)
 Hans Roelen (24 July 1963 – 16 July 1969)
 Henk Talsma (16 July 1969 – 1978)
 Hendrik Toxopeus (1978 – 1979)
 Jan Kamminga (1979 – 22 May 1981)
 Liesbeth Tuijnman (22 May 1981 – December 1985)
 Ivo Opstelten (February 1986 – 22 May 1993)
 Jan Gmelich Meijling (22 May 1993 – 22 Augustus 1994)
 Ronald Haafkens (22 Augustus 1994 – 28 May 1999)
 Sari van Heemskerck Pillis-Duvekot (28 May 1999 – 2004; Co-Chair)
 Rudolf Sandberg tot Essenburg (28 May 1999 – 2000; Co-Chair)
 Paul Tirion (2000 – 2001; Co-Chair)
 Mark Harbers (2001 – 2005; Co-Chair)
 Ines Adema (2004 – 4 April 2008; Co-Chair)
 Rogier van der Sande (2005 – 4 April 2008; Co-Chair)
 Mark Verheijen (4 April 2008 – 21 May 2012)
 Wiet de Bruijn (21 May 2012 – 14 June 2014; Co-Chair)
 Robert Reibestein (21 May 2012 – 14 June 2014;Co-Chair)
 Jeannette Baljeu (14 June 2014 – 20 May 2017)
 Eric Wetzels (since 20 May 2017)

See also
 People's Party for Freedom and Democracy
 Leader of the People's Party for Freedom and Democracy

References

External links
Official

  

 
 
Netherlands politics-related lists